Carl Sonnenschein (July 15, 1876 - February 20, 1929) was a German writer and Catholic priest, the founder of the Catholic student movement in Germany.

He was born in Düsseldorf and died in Berlin.

The Catholic Fraternities in Germany (KV) created the annual Carl Sonnenschein prize to award outstanding scientific research in Germany.

Literary works 
 Die sozialstudentische Bewegung, 1909
 Notizen (Weltstadtbetrachtungen), Berlin 1926 - 1928
 Sonntagsevangelien (Erklärungen), Berlin 1928

References 
 Alfred Kumpf: Ein Leben für die Großstadt, Leipzig 1980
 Ernst Thrasolt: Carl Sonnenschein. Der Mensch und sein Werk, 1930
 Ernst Thrasolt: Dr. Carl Sonnenschein. Erinnerungen und Geschichtsversuche, 1929

External links 
 
 Winners of the Carl Sonnenschein prize

1876 births
1929 deaths
Writers from Düsseldorf
German Roman Catholics
German male writers